The JWP Junior Championship was a women's professional wrestling championship owned by the JWP Joshi Puroresu promotion. It was introduced on June 16, 1995, when Candy Okutsu defeated Hiromi Sugou and Hiromi Yagi in a three-way match to become the inaugural champion.

On June 17, 2007, the reigning JWP Junior Champion Arisa Nakajima won the Princess of Pro-Wrestling (POP) Championship on the JDStar promotion's second to last event. Though the two titles were technically not unified, they were defended together from this point onward. The titles remained together in JWP for nearly a decade before it was announced on February 8, 2017, that the promotion was shutting down. As a result, the two titles would once again be separated with the JWP title remaining with the promotion's production company, while the POP title moved on to Command Bolshoi's follow-up promotion to JWP. It is currently unknown whether the JWP producers plan to stay in the professional wrestling business.

The JWP Junior Championship was originally meant for wrestlers with less than four years of experience in professional wrestling, but in June 2010, the limit was raised to five years. In May 2012, the experience limit was lowered back down to four years. The title was vacated eight times; five times due to the reigning champion surpassing the experience limit.

Like most professional wrestling championships, the title was won as a result of a scripted match. There were thirty-one reigns shared among twenty-six different wrestlers. The title was retired on April 2, 2017, when JWP Joshi Puroresu went out of business. That same day, Yako Fujigasaki won the final match contested for the JWP Junior Championship by making her second successful defense against Saori Anou.

History 
Candy Okutsu was the first champion in the title's history and Yako Fujigasaki the final. She also shares the record for most reigns with Arisa Nakajima, Hiromi Yagi, Rabbit Miu and Rydeen Hagane, with two. Kaori Yoneyama only reign holds the record for the longest reign, at 771 days, while Okutsu's second reign holds the record for the shortest reign at less than one day. Overall, there were thirty-one reigns shared among twenty-six different wrestlers.

Title history

Combined reigns

References

External links 
 JWP's official website
 Title history at Wrestling-Titles.com

JWP Joshi Puroresu championships
Women's professional wrestling championships